Milton is a hamlet in Angus, Scotland situated near Glamis. Considerable early history is in the general area including Glamis Castle and the Eassie Stone, a carved Pictish stone dating prior to the Early Middle Ages.

See also
Charleston
Sidlaw Hills

References

Villages in Angus, Scotland